Within United States federal legislation, an empowerment zone is an economically distressed community eligible to receive tax incentives and grants from the United States federal government under the Empowerment Zones and Enterprise Communities Act of 1993.

Program 

The Empowerment Zone Program consists of three US congressional designations. The Renewal Communities (RCs), Empowerment Zones (EZs) and Enterprise Communities (ECs) are highly distressed urban and rural communities that may be eligible for a combination of grants, tax credits for businesses, bonding authority and other benefits. Highly distressed refers to communities who have experienced poverty and/or high emigration based upon definitions in the law. These designations, RCs, EZs and ECs were awarded in three competitions since 1994. The program was the legislative response to riots that erupted in 1992 in Los Angeles after justification of police officers charged in the beating of an African-American motorist during the arrest. The Community Renewal Tax Relief Act of 2000 authorized the creation of 40 renewal communities and created the New Markets Tax Credit Program.  The program originally ended on December 31, 2011. However, on February 1, 2013, the Joint Committee on Taxation extended the program for another two years to December 31, 2013. The Protecting Americans from Tax Hikes Act, signed into law on December 18, 2015, later extended the program through the end of 2016.

This program is primarily managed through partnerships between the local entity and either the Department of Housing and Urban Development (HUD) for RCs and urban areas or US Department of Agriculture (USDA) for rural EZs and ECs.

Currently, there are 40 HUD RCs, 28 of which are in urban areas and 12 in rural communities. There are 30 HUD EZs, all of which are in urban areas. There are 10 USDA EZs and 20 USDA ECs in rural communities. A couple RCs have as few as approximately 100 businesses, while several RCs and EZs have more than 5,000 businesses. No RC, EZ or EC has a population greater than 200,000.

Tax Incentives and Bonds 
Qualifying businesses in EZs are eligible for employment credits (up to $3,000 yearly per EZ resident employed). Qualifying EZ businesses are also eligible for low-cost loans through EZ facility bonds, increased Section 179 tax deductions, partial-exclusion of tax on capital gains upon the sale of certain assets, and other incentives. Qualifying businesses in RCs are also eligible for employment credits (up to $1,500 yearly per RC resident employed).

Qualifying RC businesses are also eligible for a 0% tax on the capital gains of assets sold, provided the business holds the asset at least five years. Businesses in RCs that build or substantially rehabilitate commercial property may also be eligible for up to $10 million in Commercial Revitalization Deductions to rapidly increase their depreciation schedules. For detailed information on all RC/EZ tax incentives, including which tax forms to file to claim the incentives, read IRS Publication 954, Tax Incentives for Distressed Communities.

The empowerment zone employment credit provides businesses with an incentive to hire individuals who both live and work in an empowerment zone.  (An exception applies to the Washington, DC empowerment zone. Individuals who work in the Washington, DC empowerment zone may live anywhere in the District of Columbia.)  You can claim the credit if you pay or incur “qualified zone wages” to a “qualified zone employee”.

The credit is 20% of the qualified zone wages paid or incurred during a calendar year. The amount of qualified zone wages you can use to figure the credit cannot be more than $15,000 for each employee for each calendar year. As a result, the credit can be as much as $3,000 (20% of $15,000) per qualified zone employee each year.

Although the Empowerment Zone wage tax credit program expired on December 31, 2011, credits can still be claimed by amending tax returns for the years 2009, 2010, and 2011. The Renewal Community program expired on December 31, 2009, but a company can still amend its tax return for 2009 to claim the available credits.

Parts of the following urban areas are empowerment zones:

Parts of the following rural areas are empowerment zones:

See also
 Ke `Aupuni Lokahi - A former empowerment zone and enterprise community in Molokai, Hawaii.
 Renewal community
 New Markets Tax Credit Program
 Community Renewal Tax Relief Act of 2000

References

Sources
US Department of Housing and Urban Development, Questions and Answers on Renewal Community (RC) and Empowerment Zone (EZ) tax incentives
 US Internal Revenue Service; TAX INCENTIVES FOR DISTRESSED COMMUNITIES, IRS Publication 954.

External links
US Department of Housing and Urban Development
 US Dept of Agriculture, Rural Development
Internal Revenue Service

.
United States Department of Housing and Urban Development
United States Department of Agriculture